William Leap is an emeritus professor of anthropology at American University (Washington, DC) and an affiliate professor in the Women's, Gender and Sexuality Studies Program at Florida Atlantic University (Boca Raton, FL). He works in the overlapping fields of language and sexuality studies and queer linguistics, and queer historical linguistics.

William Leap earned his bachelor's degree from Florida State University in 1967 and his Ph.D. from Southern Methodist University in 1970. His dissertation advisor was George Trager.

Contributions 
Leap has been openly gay since he began teaching at American University in Washington, D.C. in 1970. Leap is a leading academic in Lavender linguistics and has been a recipient of the American Anthropological Association Ruth Benedict Award for publishing in Gay and Lesbian anthropology in 1996, 2003, and 2009. He founded the annual Lavender Languages & Linguistics conference in 1993 to coincide with the March on Washington for Lesbian, Gay and Bi Equal Rights and Liberation.  The conference continues to meet annually, and provides a focal point for international discussion of lgbtq-related language issues worldwide. The Lavender Language Institute, a summer program that Leap founded at Florida Atlantic University in 2017, offers training in queer linguistics to undergraduates, grad students, and others interested in language and sexuality studies.  

In 2012, Leap launched The Journal of Language and Sexuality with Heiko Motschenbacher. He has been a member of the American Anthropological Association's AIDS task force  and co-chaired the AAA's Commission on Gay, Lesbian Bisexual, Trans  and Queer Issues in Anthropology (1993-1998). He has done research among Native Americans of the Southwest U.S., South Africans, and Gay men in Washington, DC. He was one of the first researchers to study American Indian varieties of English (including American Indian Pidgin English) in the same way that others had studied Black English, and he has been prominent in Indian language revitalization projects.

Lavender Languages and Linguistics Conference 
Lavender Languages and Linguistics conference is an international conference for LGBT linguistics and other related queer language research and discourse studies. The conference was founded in 1993 by Leap to coincide with the March on Washington for Lesbian, Gay and Bi Equal Rights and Liberation. At the time, research on these topics was considered marginal within linguistics, and the conference was a key place for researchers to come together to discuss issues in the field. By the 20th conference, there were over 80 presentations and 150 attendees. The conference was host yearly at American University in Washington, DC until 2017 when the conference began to move each year. It provides a place for emerging queer linguistics scholarship, and it is the conference is the longest continually running LGBT studies conference in the US. 

A meta-synthesis of conference abstracts by Paul Baker and published in Milani's chapter in The Oxford Handbook of Language and Society found early work presented at the conference focused on the existence of "gay language" such as Polari and "lesbian language". In line with the trajectory of the field, more recent work has focused on how various linguistic features index different identities.

The Journal of Language and Sexuality (though not officially linked to LavLang) is closely affiliated with the conference. It was established venue to publish queer linguistics research.

Lavender Languages Summer Institute 
In 2017 the Lavender Languages Conference expanded to a Summer Institute, a summer program that Leap founded Florida Atlantic University. The institute offers 10 days of class discussion, research opportunities and informal conversations exploring topics of current interest in language and sexuality studies, queer linguistics, and various lavender language themes. The program focuses on training undergraduates, grad students, and others interested in language and sexuality studies.

Selected publications 
2020 Language Before Stonewall London: Palgrave. 
2020  Language, sexuality, history. in The Oxford Handbook of Language and Sexuality. Kira Hall and Rusty Barrett.  New York: Oxford University Press.
2016  Language, sexuality, heteroglossia and intersectionality. in The Routledge Handbook of Linguistic Anthropology.  Nancy Bonvillain,. 177-190. New York: Routledge. 
2015 Queer linguistics as critical discourse analysis. in The Handbook of Discourse Analysis. Deborah Tannen, Heidi E. Hamilton and Deborah Schiffrin. 661-680.
2012 Queer linguistics, sexuality and discourse analysis. in The Routledge Handbook of Discourse Analysis James Paul Gee and Michael Haniford eds. 558-571. New York: Routledge.
2011  Language, gay pornography and audience reception. Journal of Homosexuality 58(6-7);932-952).
2010 Homophobia as moral geography. Gender and Language 4(2):187-220. 
2009 Introducing Sociolinguistics, (2nd ed.) (Raj Mesthre, Joan Swann, Anna Deumert, and William Leap). Edinburgh: University of Edinburgh Press. (First edition, 2000)
2009 (co-edited with Ellen Lewin) Out in Public: Lesbian and Gay Anthropology in a Globalizing World. Malden MA: Wiley-Blackwell.
2008 Queering gay men's English. in Gender and Language Research Methodologies. Kate Harrington, Lia Lotosseliti, Helen Sauntson and Jane Sunderland. 283-296. Basingstoke: Palgrave. 
2007 (with Liz Morrish) Sex talk: Language, desire, identity and beyond. in Language, Sexualities, and Desires: Cross-Cultural Perspectives.  Helen Sauntson and Sakis Kyratzsis. 17-40.  London: Palgrave Press.
2007 Queering the disaster: A Presidential session. (with Ellen Lewin and Natasha Wilson). North American Dialogues, 10(2):11-14. 
2005 "Finding the Centre: Claiming gay space in Cape Town, South Africa." in Performing Queer: Shaping Sexualities 1992-2004. Mikki van Zyl and Melissa Steyn, eds. pp. 235–266. Cape Town: Kwela Press.
2004 "Marriage," "Family" and Same-Sex Marriage: Are We Addressing the Right Questions? Anthropology Newsletter, 45(6): 6.
2004 (co-edited with Tom Boellstorff) Speaking in Queer Tongues: Globalization and Gay Language. Urbana: University of Illinois Press.
2003 Language and gendered modernity. in The Handbook of Language and Gender. Janet Holmes and Miriam Meyerhoff, eds. pp. 401–422. London: Blackwell
2002 (co-edited with Ellen Lewin) Out in Theory: The Emergence of Lesbian and Gay Anthropology. Urbana: University of Illinois Press.
1998 (editor) Public Sex/Gay Space New York City: Columbia University Press.
1996 (co-edited with Ellen Lewin) Out in the Field: Lesbian and Gay Reflections. Urbana: University of Illinois Press.
1996 Word's Out: Gay Men's English. Minneapolis: University of Minnesota Press. (Now in second printing). A sociolinguistic discussion of gay English, including coded terms.
1996 Representation, subjectivity and ethics in urban gay ethnography (with Alan Hersker). City and Society, 12: 142-147.
1995 Review essay: Liminal gender categories: Third Sex, Third Gender. [Gilbert Herdt, ed]. American Anthropologist, 87 (3): 589-590.

References

External links
Profile at American University
Leap interviewed in "Gay Talk" on And Sometimes Y, 19:05-25:41 on CBC Radio, September 2007
https://www.facebook.com/lavlang
https://twitter.com/lavlang?lang=en
https://twitter.com/LavenderLangFAU
https://www.fau.edu/artsandletters/lavender-languages/

Living people
American anthropologists
LGBT anthropologists
American University faculty and staff
LGBT linguistics
Linguists from the United States
Anthropological linguists
Year of birth missing (living people)
Florida State University alumni
Southern Methodist University alumni
American LGBT scientists
Gay academics
Gay scientists